is a Japanese brand of refillable markers and related products made by the Too Corporation and distributed in the United States and Canada by its subsidiary, "Too Corporation Americas".

Description
Copic is most famous for its marker line-up, which uses alcohol-based ink colours and are refillable using standard colours ink refills. While there is a standard set of 358 colors, refill inks can be mixed to create custom colours, and empty markers are sold for this purpose. Sketch markers, the most popular product line, have a chisel-style tip at one end and a brush tip at the other, though additional styles of replaceable nibs and tips are available.

The company also sells an airbrush system which utilizes either an air compressor or canned air to blow ink off the tips of the markers onto the paper.

History 
In 1987, the initial classic line of Copic Markers was introduced in Japan. A total of 71 colours were launched and were developed to meet designers’ demand for photocopy-safe markers. The markers would not dissolve the toner of freshly-printed photocopies, and in turn the markers were given the name Copic, derived from the word “copies”.

In 1989, an additional 71 colours were added to the line, adding a set of more neutral tones and grays to the marker’s library. These additional tones were created to accommodate for architectural design and figure painting. 

In 1991, 72 new colours were added to meet the need to design environments and fashion.

In 1993, Copic Sketch was introduced with an assortment of 144 colours. These markers featured a Super Brush Nib, a brush that was quickly adopted by manga and anime illustrators. 

In 1998, the Copic Ciao marker was introduced. The line was released with 72 colours chosen for beginners.

Copic Marker types 

 Sketch
 Copic Sketch markers are available in all 358 Copic colours, with a brush nib and a chisel-shaped nib. They have an oval barrel. They are compatible with the Copic Airbrush System. These are the most popular marker from Too Corporation.

 Ciao
 Ciao markers are available in 180 colours. They have a brush nib, a chisel nib, and a circular barrel. They are smaller than Copic's other markers and are marketed as a more affordable option.

 Classic
 Classic markers are available in 214 colours with nine different tip options, including: two calligraphy tips, two types of broad tips, and a range of fine nibs. They come with a chisel nib and a bullet nib on each side.

 Wide
 Wide markers were available in 36 colours, had a wide chisel-shaped nib and a large oval shaped barrel. They have been used for large backgrounds as well as calligraphy. Too Corporation has discontinued the production of coloured Copic Wide in 2016, but Copic Wide Original (empty marker) continues to be sold.

 Refill
 Copic markers can be refilled with Copic ink refills. It is also possible to mix inks to create custom colours.

Copic Color System 
The Copic Color System identifies and categorizes ink colours by using short colour codes. Such codes can be found on the base of any marker, as well as on the caps of classic and sketch markers.

Copic Colour Wheel 

The letter(s) on your marker represents the colour family it falls into. There are currently 16 Copic Marker colour families:

Chromatic Colours (and Fluorescent Colour) 
R - Red
B - Blue
Y - Yellow
G - Green
V - Violet (Purple)
YR - Yellow-Red (Orange)
BG - Blue-Green (Teal/Turquoise)
YG - yellow-green family
BV - Blue-Violet
RV - Red-Violet (Pink)
E - Earth Tones (Brown)
 F - Fluorescent/Neon colours

Gray Tones 
N - Neutral Gray
C - Cool Gray
W - Warm Gray
T - Toner Gray

Achromatic Colours 

 1 - Black Copic Markers are represented by number only: 100, and 110 for special (rich) black.
0 - Colourless Blender Markers are coded with a single 0 as they contain alcohol-based fluid with no pigment.

Colour Saturation (Blending Group) 
Following the letter is the first number. The first digit represents the level of saturation of the Copic Marker. This number ranges between 0- 9, with 0 being the purest form of colour and 9 being most desaturated (with the highest level of gray).

Colour Value (Shade/Intensity) 
The last digit(s) on Copic Markers represent a marker's colour intensity (aka how bright that colour is). These numbers are split between 12 levels (000, 00 and 0-9).  Markers that fall closer to the 0 range are lighter in value, and become darker the closer they shift toward 9. Markers that are 000 and 00 in nature are often more transparent as they have a higher concentration of colourless blender alcohol-based fluid.

Pens 
Four types of pens are sold under the Copic brand, all of which are marketed as having "Copic-proof" ink that does not smudge when coloured over with a Copic marker:

 The Multiliner is a fineliner. It is available in ten different colours and seven different nib thicknesses.
 The Multiliner SP is an upgraded version of the Multiliner with an aluminium body, a replaceable nib, and a replaceable ink cartridge. It is only available in black ink.
 The Gasenfude is a brush pen, available in black ink. Unlike some other manufacturers' brush pens, it cannot be refilled.
 The Drawing Pen features a fountain pen nib. It is available in black and sepia (brown) inks, and in two nib sizes.

Copic Airbrush System 
The airbrush system uses disposable cans of compressed air, or air from a compressor, to spray ink from Copic Original and Sketch markers onto a surface. Airbrushing uses less ink than direct colouring since saturating the paper isn't necessary.

References

External links

 
 Design Burger, Design Dialogues collaboration
 Copic Award

1987 establishments in Japan
Art materials brands
Companies established in 1987
Japanese brands
Japanese stationery